Florin Vașken Halagian (7 March 1939 – 12 August 2019) was a Romanian football player and manager of Armenian descent, hence the nickname Armeanul (The Armenian). He is the manager who has the most matches in Liga I with 878 games consisting of 432 victories, 176 draws and 270 losses.

On 25 March 2008 he was decorated by the president of Romania, Traian Băsescu for all of his achievements as a football coach, and for forming a young generation of future champions with Ordinul "Meritul Sportiv" — (The Order "The Sportive Merit") class III.

Halagian was the manager of the Romania national football team for one match during 1979.

In 2011, Halagian returned to Gloria Bistriţa, but was sacked 3 weeks later because of issues regarding players shaving before matches.

One of Halagian's famous quotes as coach was: Focu' la ei! (Fire at them!), Armeanul explained: This is an expression that I invented to convey to the players on the pitch that the ball is good to be on the opponent half of the pitch, even if we have possession or not, I told them it is better to play there.

Honours

Manager
Argeş Pitești
Divizia A (2): 1971–72, 1978–79
Steaua București
Divizia A (1): 1984–85
Dinamo București
Divizia A (1): 1991–92

References

External links
 Florin Halagian's profile 
 Florin Halagian's coaching stats

1939 births
2019 deaths
Romanian people of Armenian descent
Footballers from Bucharest
Romanian footballers
Association football midfielders
Liga I players
Liga II players
FC Dinamo București players
FC Progresul București players
Victoria București players
FC Argeș Pitești players
FC Petrolul Ploiești players
CS Minaur Baia Mare (football) players
FC Sportul Studențesc București players
Vagonul Arad players
Romanian football managers
FC Argeș Pitești managers
Romania national football team managers
FC Steaua București managers
CS Universitatea Craiova managers
Victoria București managers
FC Dinamo București managers
FC Inter Sibiu managers
FC Progresul București managers
FCM Bacău managers
FC Brașov (1936) managers
CSM Ceahlăul Piatra Neamț managers
ACF Gloria Bistrița managers
CS Mioveni managers